1707 Chantal, provisional designation , is a stony background asteroid  from the Florian region in the inner asteroid belt, approximately  in diameter. It was discovered on 8 September 1932, by astronomer Eugène Delporte at the Royal Observatory of Belgium in Uccle. The S-type asteroid has a rotation period of at least 10 hours. It was named for Chantal, the niece of Belgian astronomer Georges Roland.

Orbit and classification 

According to modern HCM-analyses by Nesvorný, as well as by Milani and Knežević, Chantal is a non-family asteroid from the main belt's background population. In an older HCM-analysis (Zappalà (1990–97), it is a member of the Flora family, a giant asteroid family and the largest family of stony asteroids in the main-belt. It orbits the Sun in the inner asteroid belt at a distance of 1.8–2.6 AU once every 3 years and 4 months (1,207 days; semi-major axis of 2.22 AU). Its orbit has an eccentricity of 0.17 and an inclination of 4° with respect to the ecliptic. The body's observation arc begins at Uccle Observatory in October 1932, or seven weeks after its official discovery observation.

Naming 

This minor planet was named by the discoverer Eugène Delporte after Chantal, a niece of Belgian astronomer Georges Roland (1922–1991) at of Uccle and co-discoverer of the Comet Arend–Roland. The official naming citation was published by the Minor Planet Center on 8 April 1982. Asteroid 1711 Sandrine was also named by the discoverer after a (grand)-niece of Roland.

Physical characteristics 

In the Tholen classification, Chantal is a common, stony S-type asteroid.

Rotation period 

In October 1975, a rotational lightcurve of Chantal was obtained from photometric observations by Swedish astronomer Claes-Ingvar Lagerkvist at the Uppsala Astronomical Observatory. Analysis of the fragmentary lightcurve gave a rotation period of at least  hours with a brightness amplitude of more than 0.2 magnitude.

Diameter and albedo 

According to the survey carried out by the NEOWISE mission of NASA's Wide-field Infrared Survey Explorer, Chantal measures between 7.46 and 7.62 kilometers in diameter and its surface has an albedo between 0.28 and 0.31. The Collaborative Asteroid Lightcurve Link assumes a standard albedo for a stony asteroid of 0.20 and calculates a diameter of 9.23 kilometers based on an absolute magnitude of 12.54.

References

External links 
 Asteroid Lightcurve Database (LCDB), query form (info )
 Dictionary of Minor Planet Names, Google books
 Discovery Circumstances: Numbered Minor Planets (1)-(5000) – Minor Planet Center
 
 

001707
Discoveries by Eugène Joseph Delporte
Named minor planets
001707
19320908